Fritillaria rhodia, called the Rhodian fritillary, is a Greek species of plant in the lily family Liliaceae. The only known wild populations are on the Island of Rhodes in the Aegean Sea, although the species has been cultivated elsewhere.

References

External links

Pacific Bulb Society, European Fritillaria Two photos of several species including  Fritillaria rhodia
Fritillaria Group, The Alpine Garden Society, Fritillaria species R-S photos of several species including  Fritillaria rhodia

rhodia
Endemic flora of Greece
Plants described in 1969
Rhodes